Mohan Raj, better known by his stage name Keerikkadan Jose, is an Indian actor who works in Malayalam, Tamil, and Telugu-language films.

Personal life
Mohan Raj is married to Usha. They have two daughters, Jaishma and Kaaviya.  He is settled at Madurai with family.Currently he is working as an Enforcement Assistant Officer for India Government.

Filmography

Malayalam

Moonnam Mura - (1988) as gunda
Kireedam - (1989) as Keerikkadan Jose 
Ardham - (1989) as Stanley 
Aye Auto - (1990)
Vyooham - (1990) 
Rajavazhcha - (1990) as Karadi Vasu 
Oliyampukal - (1990) as Vasu 
Nale Ennundenkil (1990) as Gajaraja
Marupuram (1990)
Purappadu - (1990) as Samuel
Nagarathil Samsara Vishayam - (1991) as Vikraman
Aanaval Mothiram - (1991) as Guru
Mimics Parade - (1991)
Koodikazhcha - (1991) as 'Mortuary' Karunan 
Cheppu Kilukkunna Changathi - (1991)
Amina Tailors - (1991) as Malappuram Moideen
Kanalkkattu - (1991) as Kareem Bhai
Kasarkode Khaderbai - (1992)
Uppukandam Brothers - (1993) as Uppukandam Paulachan
Pravachakan- (1993) as Freddy 
Porutham - (1993) 
Customs Diary - (1993) as Britto
Chenkol - (1993) as Keerikkadan Jose 
Cabinet - (1994) as Mahendran
Vishnu - (1994) as 'Kallan' Raghavan
Arabikadaloram - (1995) as Hassanbava 
Hitler - (1996) as Devarajan
Naalamkettile Nalla Thambimar -(1996)
Yuvathurki - (1996)
Rajaputhran - (1996) as K. C. 
Aaraam Thampuran - (1997) as Chenkalam Madhavan
Bhoopathi - (1997) as Khader
Sooryaputhran - (1998)
Stalin Sivadas - (1999) as BSS Leader
Vazhunnor - (1999) as Sahadevan 
Pathram - (1999) as Chandan Bhai
Narasimham- (2000) as Bhaskaran
Red Indians - (2001) as Hyder Marakkyar
Chenchayam - (2001)
Sharja To Sharja - (2001)
Janakeeyam - (2003) as DYSP Mohandas
The Fire - (2003) 
Mr. Brahmachari - (2003) as Masthan Majeedbhai
Naran - (2005) as Kuttychira Pappan
Highway Police - (2006) as Khan Bhai
Balram Vs Tharadas - (2006) as Anali Bhaskaran
Mayavi - (2007) as Yatheedran
Time - (2007) as Sunny Kuriachan
Hallo - (2007) as Pattambi Ravi 
Aayudham - (2008) as DYSP Hamza
Twenty20 - (2008) as Goon 
LollyPop - (2008)
Happy Darbar - (2011)
Chirakodinja Kinavukal - (2015) as Driver Jose
Rorschach - (2022) as Sujatha's father

Tamil
Aangalai Nambathey (1987)
Kazhugumalai Kallan (1988)
Dharma Durai (1991)
Thanga Pappa (1993)
Karnaa (1995)
Dhill (2001) as Minister Vedhanayagam 
Ezhumalai (2002) as Kalingarayan
Chandramukhi (2005) as Nair
Ameerin Aadhi Baghavan (2013) as Kondal Rao

Telugu
Iddaru Iddare (1990)
Lorry Driver (1990)
Stuartpuram Police Station (1991)
Assembly Rowdy (1991)
Brahma (1992)
Chinarayudu (1992)
Rowdy Inspector (1992)
Mechanic Alludu (1993)
Bobbili Simham (1994)
Pokiri Raja (1995)
Soggaadi Pellam (1996)
Sarada Bullodu (1996)
Pelli Chesukundam (1997)
Sivayya (1998)
Samarasimha Reddy (1999)
Sri Ramulayya (1999)
Narasimha Naidu (2001)
Adhipathi (2001)
Chennakesava Reddy (2002)
Seetayya (2003)
Palnati Brahmanayudu (2003)
Sivamani (2003)
Raghavendra (2003)
Shiva Shankar (2004)

TV serials
Malayalam
Kadamattathu Kathanar
Swami Ayyappan
Moonumani

References

External links 
 

Living people
Year of birth missing (living people)
Male actors in Malayalam cinema
Male actors in Tamil cinema
Male actors in Telugu cinema
Indian male film actors
20th-century Indian male actors
21st-century Indian male actors
Indian male television actors
Male actors in Malayalam television